The Lehi Ward Tithing Barn-Centennial Hall, located behind 651 North 200 East in Lehi, Utah, was built in 1872.  It was listed on the National Register of Historic Places in 1998.

It was moved to its present location in 1880.

Tithe barns in Europe are some of the largest and oldest timber frame buildings. They are found in many European countries. In America, The Church of Jesus Christ of Latter-day Saints is the only known religious group which built tithing barns.

See also
 Bishops storehouse

References

Tithing buildings of the Church of Jesus Christ of Latter-day Saints
Infrastructure completed in 1872
Buildings and structures in Lehi, Utah
Barns on the National Register of Historic Places in Utah
Former Latter Day Saint church buildings
National Register of Historic Places in Utah County, Utah
Properties of religious function on the National Register of Historic Places in Utah
1872 establishments in Utah Territory
Relocated buildings and structures in Utah